Christine Trefry (born 10 May 1955 in Cunderdin) is an Australian sport shooter. She tied for fifteenth place in the women's 25 metre pistol event at the 2000 Summer Olympics.

References

1955 births
Living people
Australian female sport shooters
Olympic shooters of Australia
Shooters at the 2000 Summer Olympics
Commonwealth Games medallists in shooting
Commonwealth Games gold medallists for Australia
Commonwealth Games silver medallists for Australia
Shooters at the 1994 Commonwealth Games
Shooters at the 1998 Commonwealth Games
20th-century Australian women
21st-century Australian women
Medallists at the 1994 Commonwealth Games
Medallists at the 1998 Commonwealth Games